Luther Curtis Knight, Jr.  (born April 14, 1943) is a former NFL placekicker for the Washington Redskins of the National Football League (1969–1973). In 1971, Knight led the NFL in both field goals made (29) and attempts (49),  and he also led the NFC in scoring that same season (114 points). During the off-season he worked toward a BBA at the University of Texas.

References

1943 births
Living people
American football placekickers
National Conference Pro Bowl players
Sportspeople from Gulfport, Mississippi
Texas Longhorns football players
Washington Redskins players
Players of American football from Mississippi